Dusetai Manor was a former residential manor in Didžiadvaris village, Zarasai District Municipality, Lithuania.

References

Manor houses in Lithuania